This is a list of birds whose range includes, at least in part, the Sierra Madre Oriental, a mountain range in northeastern Mexico.
 
As a twin mountain range to the Sierra Madre Occidental, some species will occur in both; because of the separation by the Mexican Plateau some will occur only in one range. A few species are regionally endemic.

Bushtit, Psaltriparus minimus
Great curassow, Crax rubra
Greenish elaenia, Myiopagis viridicata
White-bellied emerald, Amazilia candida
Blue-hooded euphonia, Euphonia elegantissima
Barred forest-falcon, Micrastur ruficollis
Boat-billed flycatcher, Megarynchus pitangua
Cordilleran flycatcher, Empidonax occidentalis
Hammond's flycatcher, Empidonax hammondii
Pine flycatcher, Empidonax affinis
Crested guan, Penelope purpurascens
Ornate hawk-eagle, Spizaetus ornatus
Blue-throated hummingbird, Lampornis clemenciae
Broad-tailed hummingbird, Selasphorus platycercus
Magnificent hummingbird, Eugenes fulgens
White-eared hummingbird, Hylocharis leucotis
Mexican jay, Aphelocoma ultramarina
Unicolored jay, Aphelocoma unicolor
Montezuma oropendola, Psarocolius montezuma
Flammulated owl, Otus flammeolus
Whiskered screech-owl, Megascops trichopsis
Maroon-fronted parrot, Rhynchopsitta terrisi
Western wood pewee, Contopus sordidulus
Band-tailed pigeon, Patagioenas fasciata
Painted redstart, Myioborus pictus
Black-headed saltator, Saltator atriceps
Slate-coloured solitaire, Myadestes unicolor
Rufous-crowned sparrow, Aimophila ruficeps
Vaux's swift, Chaetura vauxi
White-throated swift, Aeronautes saxatalis
Flame-colored tanager, Piranga bidentata
Hepatic tanager, Piranga flava
Bridled titmouse, Baeolophus wollweberi
Emerald toucanet, Aulacorhynchus prasinus
Spotted towhee, Pipilo maculatus
Gartered trogon, Trogon caligatus
Hutton's vireo, Vireo huttoni
Yellow-green vireo, Vireo flavoviridis
Golden-browed warbler, Basileuterus belli
Hermit warbler, Dendroica occidentalis
Hooded warbler, Wilsonia citrina
Red warbler, Cardellina ruber
Red-faced warbler, Cardellina rubrifrons
Spot-crowned woodcreeper, Lepidocolaptes affinis
Acorn woodpecker, Melanerpes formicivorus

 
Sierra Madre Oriental